John Jani Janardhan may refer to:
 John Jani Janardhan (1984 film), a Hindi film
 John Jani Janardhan (2016 film), an unrelated Kannada comedy drama film